The Gran Arena del Cibao Dr. Oscar Gobaira, formerly known as the Palacio de los Deportes, is a multi-purpose arena in Santiago de los Caballeros, Dominican Republic, built in 1978. The arena has a capacity of 8,768 seats, consisting of 7,000 regular seats, 668 comfortable armchairs and 1,100 luxury seats that are fully reclinable. The arena has a modern acoustic system, which has 16 speakers and 10 monitors. The arena was remodeled for the Dominican Republic National Basketball Team in accordance with the requirements of FIBA. The cost of the renovations amounted to about RD$528,000,000. The arena Host, Metros de Santiago, national basketball team.

The arena is also used for other purposes such as the Miss Dominican Republic pageant in 2011. As a Concert Venue, Aventura was the first act to perform at the venue since it remodelation in 2008. It was the first massive concert in the city in the last 10 years. Other artist such as Ricardo Arjona, Daddy Yankee, Wisin & Yandel, Don Omar, Julio Iglesias, Calle 13 and Gilberto Santa Rosa had performed in the venue.

Notable events and concerts

Notes

References

External links 
 PDLDDC official page

Santiago de los Caballeros
Indoor arenas in the Dominican Republic
Buildings and structures in Santiago Province (Dominican Republic)
Basketball venues in the Dominican Republic
Volleyball venues in the Dominican Republic